Ron Giteau (born 31 May 1955) is an Australian former professional rugby league footballer. A prolific point-scoring centre, he was captain of the Canberra Raiders team in the New South Wales Rugby Football League premiership. Giteau also played for Western Suburbs and Eastern Suburbs.

He was a Wests junior graded from the Enfield Federals junior club in 1974.

Ron Giteau is the father of former Australian rugby union player, Matt Giteau and Australia women's dual-code rugby international Kristy Giteau.

References

Sources
 
 

 

1955 births
Living people
Australian people of French descent
Australian rugby league players
Canberra Raiders captains
Canberra Raiders players
Rugby league centres
Rugby league players from Sydney
Sydney Roosters players
Western Suburbs Magpies players